Ricer may refer to:

 Potato ricer, an implement used for food preparation
 A rice burner car, or by extension a driver or builder such cars, generally rooted in Asian racial and ethnic stereotypes, in use since the 1960s